O Pagador de Promessas (Keeper of Promises) is a 1962 Brazilian drama film written and directed by Anselmo Duarte, based on the famous stage play of the same name by Dias Gomes. Shot in Salvador, Bahia, it stars Leonardo Villar.

It won the Palme d'Or at the 1962 Cannes Film Festival, becoming the first film by a Brazilian director to achieve that feat. A year later, it also became the first Brazilian and South American film nominated for the Academy Award for Best Foreign Language Film.

Plot
Zé do Burro (Leonardo Villar) is a landowner from Nordeste. His best friend is a donkey. When his donkey falls terminally ill, Zé promises to a Candomblé orisha, Iansan, that if his donkey recovers, he will give away his land to the poor and carry a cross all the way from his farm to the Saint Bárbara Church in Salvador, Bahia, where he will offer the cross to the local priest. Upon the recovery of his donkey, Zé leaves on his journey, a distance of 7 léguas (46 km; 29 miles). The movie begins as Zé, followed by his wife Rosa (Glória Menezes), arrives outside the church. The local priest (Dionísio Azevedo) refuses to accept the cross once he hears about Zé's "pagan" pledge and the reasons behind it. Everyone attempts to manipulate the innocent and naïve Zé. The local Candomblé worshippers, for example, want to use him as a leader against the discrimination they suffer from the Roman Catholic Church. The sensationalist newspapers transform his promise to give away his land into a "communist" call for land reform (which still is a very controversial issue in Brazil). When Zé is shot by the police to prevent his way into the church, the Candomblé worshippers put his dead body on the cross and force their way into the church.

Main cast
Leonardo Villar as Zé do Burro (Donkey Jack)
Glória Menezes as Rosa, Zé's wife
Dionísio Azevedo as Olavo, the priest
Geraldo Del Rey as Bonitão (Handsome), a pimp
Norma Bengell as Marly, a prostitute
Othon Bastos as the Reporter
Antônio Pitanga as Coca, the capoeira player

Awards and nominations
Academy Awards
Best Foreign Language Film (nominated)

Cannes Film Festival
Palme d'Or – Anselmo Duarte (won)

Cartagena Film Festival
Special Jury Prize – Anselmo Duarte (won)

San Francisco International Film Festival
Golden Gate Award for Best Film – Anselmo Duarte (won)
Golden Gate Award for Best Musical Score – Gabriel Migliori (won)

See also
 List of submissions to the 35th Academy Awards for Best Foreign Language Film
 List of Brazilian submissions for the Academy Award for Best Foreign Language Film

References

External links

1962 films
1962 drama films
Brazilian drama films
Brazilian films based on plays
Films directed by Anselmo Duarte
Films shot in Salvador, Bahia
Palme d'Or winners
1960s Portuguese-language films
Brazilian black-and-white films